Zsombor Garát (born 27 July 1997) is a Hungarian professional ice hockey defenceman and member of the Hungarian national team,  playing with MAC Budapest in the Erste Liga.

He married Hungarian national team defenceman Fanni Gasparics in August 2021.

References

External links

1997 births
Cedar Rapids RoughRiders players
Living people
Hungarian ice hockey defencemen
Ice hockey people from Budapest